The 2016 Axalta Faster. Tougher. Brighter. 200 was the fourth stock car race of the 2016 NASCAR Xfinity Series season and the 12th iteration of the event. The race was held on Saturday, March 12, 2016, in Avondale, Arizona at Phoenix International Raceway, a 1-mile (1.6 km) permanent low-banked tri-oval race track. The race took the scheduled 200 laps to complete. At race's end, Kyle Busch, driving for Joe Gibbs Racing, would dominate the race to win his 79th career NASCAR Xfinity Series race and his third win of the season. To fill out the podium, Erik Jones and Daniel Suárez, both driving for Joe Gibbs Racing, would finish second and third, respectively.

Background 

Phoenix International Raceway – also known as PIR – is a one-mile, low-banked tri-oval race track located in Avondale, Arizona. It is named after the nearby metropolitan area of Phoenix. The motorsport track opened in 1964 and currently hosts two NASCAR race weekends annually. PIR has also hosted the IndyCar Series, CART, USAC and the Rolex Sports Car Series. The raceway is currently owned and operated by International Speedway Corporation.

The raceway was originally constructed with a 2.5 mi (4.0 km) road course that ran both inside and outside of the main tri-oval. In 1991 the track was reconfigured with the current 1.51 mi (2.43 km) interior layout. PIR has an estimated grandstand seating capacity of around 67,000. Lights were installed around the track in 2004 following the addition of a second annual NASCAR race weekend.

Entry list 

 (R) denotes rookie driver.
 (i) denotes driver who is ineligible for series driver points.

*Driver changed to Todd Peck after Ellis wrecked in qualifying.

Practice

First practice 
The first practice session was held on Friday, March 11, at 9:30 AM MST. The session would last for 55 minutes.

Second practice 
The second practice session was held on Friday, March 11, at 1:00 PM MST. The session would last for one hour and 25 minutes.

Third and final practice 
The final practice session, sometimes known as Happy Hour, was held on Friday, March 11, at 3:30 PM MST. The session would last for 55 minutes.

Qualifying 
Qualifying was held on Saturday, March 12, at 9:45 AM MST. Since Phoenix International Raceway is under 2 miles (3.2 km), the qualifying system was a multi-car system that included three rounds. The first round was 15 minutes, where every driver would be able to set a lap within the 15 minutes. Then, the second round would consist of the fastest 24 cars in Round 1, and drivers would have 10 minutes to set a lap. Round 3 consisted of the fastest 12 drivers from Round 2, and the drivers would have 5 minutes to set a time. Whoever was fastest in Round 3 would win the pole.

Two drivers would fail to qualify: Josh Reaume and Todd Peck.

Full qualifying results

Race results

Standings after the race 

Drivers' Championship standings

Note: Only the first 12 positions are included for the driver standings.

References 

2016 NASCAR Xfinity Series
NASCAR races at Phoenix Raceway
March 2016 sports events in the United States
2016 in sports in Arizona